Robert Alexander Barr (March 12, 1908 – July 25, 2002) was a pitcher in Major League Baseball. He pitched in two games for the 1935 Brooklyn Dodgers, working 2 innings and allowing five hits and three runs.

References

External links

1908 births
2002 deaths
Allentown Brooks players
Allentown Wings players
Baseball players from Massachusetts
Beaver Falls Bees players
Brooklyn Dodgers players
Elmira Colonels players
Elmira Pioneers players
Major League Baseball pitchers
Nashville Vols players
New Bedford Whalers (baseball) players
Reading Brooks players
Sportspeople from Newton, Massachusetts
Tamagua/Slatington Dukes players
Waltham/Worcester Rosebuds players
Zanesville Cubs players